Mrs. Edith Clampton was a pseudonymous writer to the "Post Bag" (the letters to the editor section) of the Thai English newspaper, the Bangkok Post. Because of her frequent, comedically opinionated and often bizarre letters she came to be identified with the paper's letters page.

She first appeared in the early 1990s and continued contributing on a casual basis until 1996. She was portrayed as an upper-class conservative expatriate of uncertain nationality, with two servants: her maid "Khun Hazel" and her driver "Khun Parker".  Her regular appearances kept Post Bag pages topical and controversial. A collection of her letters and replies was published by the newspaper in 1996. Although the editorial staff of the newspaper were made aware of the true identity of Mrs. Clampton so that they could avoid publishing any forgeries, the creator of the pen name remains a secret.

See also
Disgusted of Tunbridge Wells

Further reading
 Edith Clampton's Letters: And Readers' Responses to Post Bag (1996), Post Books. 
 Bangkok Post, 26 December 1993. Page 30. "Those Golden Moments of 1993" – Edith Clampton (Mrs) named "Almost Women of the Year".

External links
Bangkok Post "educational services" page explaining how to write letters to the editor – citing Edith Clampton as an example.
The Legendary Edith Clampton
Bangkok Post "Opinion" Columnist Roger Crutchley on the disappearance of Edith Clampton.

Women letter writers
Mass media in Thailand
Anonymity pseudonyms
20th-century letter writers
20th-century pseudonymous writers